Humanism is an approach in study, philosophy, or practice that focuses on human values and concerns. Articles related to humanism include:



A
A Secular Humanist Declaration -
Amsterdam Declaration -
Antihumanism

B
Biosophy -
British Humanist Association

C
Camp Quest -
Celebrancy -
Christian humanism -
Committee for the Scientific Examination of Religion -
Continuum of Humanist Education

D
Democratic transhumanism

E
Evolutionary Humanism

F
Fellowship of Humanity v. County of Alameda -
Freedom and Culture -
Freethought

G

H
Happy Human -
Horapollo -
Humanism -
Humanism and Its Aspirations -
Humanist baby naming -
Humanist Manifesto -
Humanist Manifesto I -
Humanist Manifesto II -
Humanist officiant -
Humanistic capitalism -
Humanistic education -
Humanistic medicine -
Humanistic naturalism -
HumanLight

I
Incarnational humanism -
Integral humanism (India) -
Integral humanism (Maritain) -
International League of Humanists

J
John Henry Morgan

L
Logosophy

M
Marxist humanism

N
Nontheist Friend

O
Outline of humanism

P
Philosophy of environment -
Post-theism -
Posthuman -
Posthumanism

R
Religious humanism

S
Sea of Faith -
Secular ethics -
Secular humanism

T
The Associated Humans -
The Transcendental Temptation: A Critique of Religion and the Paranormal

U
Ubuntu (philosophy)

V
Value of life -
Van Wyck Brooks

W
What I Believe -
World Humanist Day

Humanism
Humanism